The Magnetic Signal Company was an American company based in Los Angeles, California focused on railway signalling. The company was the manufacturer of the ubiquitous "Magnetic Flagman" wigwag railroad crossing (or level crossing) signal seen all over California and the western states.

History
{{multiple image
|align = right
|direction = 
|total_width = 180
|perrow = 
|header = 
|image1 = Magnetic lower quadrant.jpg
|caption1 = 
|image2 = Magnetic wigwag upper quadrant.jpg
|caption2 =
|footer = Two types of wigwag by Magnetic Signal Co.: lower quadrant'''' (left) and upper quadrant (right), from a company catalog of 1922
}}
The company was established sometime after 1910, and received its first patent, on May 19, 1914. Its general offices and factory were located at 3355 East Slauson Avenue in Vernon, an industrial area just south of downtown Los Angeles. This was an ideal location for a company that would eventually supply over 7,000 wig-wag signals to the country and the world, as it had great rail access for not only shipping its products out, but for bringing in the raw materials needed to manufacture its products. The Union Pacific's old Los Angeles and Salt Lake line to the harbor ran just east of that location, and the main lines of the Southern Pacific and Santa Fe ran by just north of there as well.  This probably had a great deal to do with those three railroads being some of Magnetic Signal's biggest customers. 

In its heyday, Magnetic Signal not only manufactured wigwag signals, but also the alternating-flasher type  railroad signals, reflectorized "Railroad Crossing" signs, button reflectors for highway signs, traffic island beacons, curb beacons, flasher relays, automobile and bicycle reflectors, and even a "Portafount" portable drinking fountain.  The company had sales offices located in New York, Chicago, St. Louis, Salt Lake City, Seattle and Washington, D.C.

Although it is known that the Signal Department of the Pacific Electric Railway developed the first wigwags in 1909, under the direction of Albert Hunt, it is not known at exactly what point the Magnetic Signal Company became a separate entity. What is known is that it soon became a subsidiary of the American Brake Shoe and Foundry Company of Los Angeles, which also owned National Bearing Metals Corporation and the Canadian Ramapo Iron Works.  It remained a subsidiary of American Brake Shoe until it was purchased by the Griswold Signal Company of Minneapolis, Minnesota sometime in the late 1940s. At that time, the offices and factory on Slauson Avenue were closed down and relocated to Minneapolis.

The Magnetic Signal Company was sold to the Griswold Signal Company of Minneapolis shortly after WWII. Production of new signals continued until 1949, and replacement parts until 1960.

Bibliography
 The Life and Times of the Pacific Electric: The World's Greatest Interurban'', by Jim Walker, published by the Orange Empire Railway Museum of Perris, California (1983)

References

External links
 1922 Magnetic Signal Co. Catalog
 Magnetic Signal Company catalog on Trainweb.org

Railway signalling manufacturers
Defunct manufacturing companies based in Greater Los Angeles